Benedetto Servolini (February 25, 1805 in Florence – 1879) was an Italian painter, mainly of historical subjects.

In 1822, a watercolor sketch won a minor award from the Academy of Fine Arts of Florence. Silvestro Lega was a pupil of Servolini. Servolini taught at the Academy of Florence. Among his works, are:  
Mary Stuart
The (Girdle of) Hippolyta and Deianira
Buondelmonte Buondelmonti
Death of Filippo Strozzi (1833, now at the Accademia, Florence).

References

1805 births
1879 deaths
19th-century Italian painters
Italian male painters
Painters from Florence
19th-century Italian male artists